Otakar Škvajn (3 June 1894 – 12 September 1941) was a Czechoslovak footballer. He competed in the men's tournament at the 1920 Summer Olympics.

On a club level, he played for SK Kladno, SK Židenice, Moravská Slavia Brno, SK Slavia Prague and AC Sparta Prague.

He was forced to end his active career at the age of 26 due to the knee injury. Afterwards, Škvajn began to work as a football manager, coaching i.a. SK Prostějov, SK Kladno, Pogoń Lwów and Wisła Kraków.

References

External links
 

1894 births
1941 deaths
Czech footballers
Czechoslovak footballers
Czechoslovakia international footballers
Olympic footballers of Czechoslovakia
Footballers at the 1920 Summer Olympics
Sportspeople from Kladno
People from the Kingdom of Bohemia
SK Kladno players
FC Zbrojovka Brno players
SK Slavia Prague players
AC Sparta Prague players
Association football forwards
Czech football managers
Czechoslovak football managers
Czechoslovak expatriate football managers
Expatriate football managers in Poland
Czechoslovak expatriate sportspeople in Poland
Wisła Kraków managers